The Secret of Blood Island is a 1965 British war film directed by Quentin Lawrence and starring Jack Hedley, Barbara Shelley and Patrick Wymark.

The film is a prequel to the 1958 film The Camp on Blood Island.

Premise
British Prisoners of War help a wounded female agent, Elaine, to escape the Japanese during the Second World War.

Main cast
 Jack Hedley as Sergeant John Crewe 
 Barbara Shelley as Elaine 
 Patrick Wymark as Major Jocomo 
 Charles Tingwell as Major Dryden
 Bill Owen as George Bludgin
 Peter Welch as Richardson
 Michael Ripper as Lieutenant Tojoko
 Peter Welch as Richardson  
 Lee Montague as Levy  
 Edwin Richfield as Tom O'Reilly  
 Glyn Houston as Berry  
 David Saire as Kempi Chief  
 Philip Latham as Captain Drake  
 Ian Whittaker as Mills
 John Southworth as Leonard
 Peter Craze as Red
 Henry Davies as Taffy

Production
According to TV Guide, the film was shot in Eastmancolor and released that way in Britain, but the U.S. prints were in black & white.

Reception
The film was not as well received as Camp of Blood Island. Michael Ripper later said, " “I 
thought the story was very dodgy. I don't give a damn how hungry you are, if you haven't seen a bird in four years, or whatever it was, she'd have been stampeded, wouidn’t she? Somebody must have had the strength. I don't believe the story at all, but I must admit I had a good part in it."

The Monthly Film Bulletin called it a "grotesquely inefficient melodrama." The Guardian called it "nasty".

TV Guide called the film "fairly silly". The Radio Times called it "lurid but fairly enjoyable."

References

External links

Secret of Blood Island at Letterbox DVD
Secret of Blood Island at TCMDB
Secret of Blood Island at BFI
Secret of Blood Island at TCMDB

1964 films
British war films
1960s English-language films
Films directed by Quentin Lawrence
Films scored by James Bernard
Pacific War films
World War II prisoner of war films
Hammer Film Productions films
Films set in 1944
1964 war films
1960s British films